Vernand Morency (born February 4, 1980) is a former American football running back who played in the National Football League (NFL). He was drafted by the Houston Texans in the third round of the 2005 NFL Draft and also played for the Green Bay Packers. Morency played college football for Oklahoma State University.

Biography
Vernand Morency grew up in Miami, Florida, where his parents, immigrants from Haiti, had him working in their family real estate business from the age of 5.  This experience impacted him tremendously and helped shape a strong, disciplined work ethic which translated into successful careers in both professional baseball and football.

His love for real estate never went away and in 2006-07, Vernand was part of a syndicate group led by T Boone Pickens to develop the $250+ million Boone Pickens Stadium at his alma mater, Oklahoma State University.  In 2007 and 2008, Vernand was twice competitively selected to participate in the prestigious NFL Business Management and Entrepreneurship Program at the University of Pennsylvania's Wharton School.

Today, in addition to being an accomplished professional baseball and football player, Vernand invests, owns and manages properties across the country and is involved in several different non-profit initiatives, including work with Wisconsin Governor Jim Doyle and his Wisconsin Covenant initiative promising all eighth-graders affordable higher education upon academic success.

High school years
While attending Northwestern High School in Miami, Florida, Morency was a four-year letterman in baseball and a two-year letterman in football, and won All-America honors in both sports. As a senior football running back, he gained over 1,500 all-purpose yards and scored 15 touchdowns.

Professional baseball career
Morency was a 14th round pick (420th overall) of the Colorado Rockies in 1998. He spent four seasons as a center fielder in the Rockies’ minor league system before enrolling at Oklahoma State in 2002.

College football career
Morency attended Oklahoma State University and finished his career with 451 rushing attempts for 2,661 yards (5.9 yards per rush attempt avg.), 23 touchdowns, 11 receptions for 119 yards (10.8 yards per rec. avg.), and returned ten kickoffs for 224 yards (22.4 yards per kick ret. avg.). Morency's junior season in 2004 was his breakout season. In 2004, he rushed for 1,474 yards and 12 touchdowns. He also had one receiving touchdown. Morency was the recipient of the prestigious Thurman Thomas Award for being the most outstanding offensive player in the 2004 season. He decided to forgo his senior year at OSU and declared for the NFL draft on January 3, 2005.

NFL career

Houston Texans
Morency was selected in the third round of the 2005 NFL Draft by the Houston Texans. He was the second-string running back behind Domanick Davis for the team in 2005, rushing 46 times for 184 yards and 2 touchdowns. He also returned 20 kicks for 437 yards and caught 10 passes for 87 yards.

Green Bay Packers
After the first week of the 2006 NFL season, Morency was traded to the Green Bay Packers for running back Samkon Gado. He spent the 2006 season as the Packers' short yardage back, playing behind Ahman Green. Morency's best game of the 2006 season came against the Arizona Cardinals, where he rushed for 101 yards. On April 4, 2008, the Packers re-signed him to a one-year, $927,000 contract. On August 30, 2008, he was released from the Packers.

Career stats

Regular season

References

1980 births
Living people
American sportspeople of Haitian descent
Miami Northwestern Senior High School alumni
American football running backs
Oklahoma State Cowboys football players
Houston Texans players
Green Bay Packers players
Players of American football from Miami